The  was an infantry division of the Imperial Japanese Army. It was formed on 24 August 1937 in Kanazawa as a square division, simultaneously with the 108th division. The nucleus for the formation was the 9th division headquarters. It was subordinated from the beginning to the Japanese Northern China Area Army.

First formation
The 109th Division was sent to North China in October 1937. It closely cooperated with the 108th division, contributing to the Beiping–Hankou Railway Operation and the capture of the Linfen city. Later it also provided a garrison for the Shanxi province. The division was eventually dissolved 24 December 1939.

Second formation
The 109th Division was reformed in May 1944 from the 1st Independent Mixed Brigade and other Bonin Islands garrisons reinforced by recruits from the Kōfu mobilization district. The 109th Division was assigned to the 31st Army, under Commanding Lieutenant General Hideyoshi Obata. It comprised the bulk of the Japanese garrison on the volcanic islands of Iwo Jima and Chichi Jima which were wiped out by American forces from February to March 1945 in Battle of Iwo Jima.

The structure of the 109th was different than most divisions in the IJA. After 1936, the normal make up of a division was the triangular organization, with three infantry regiments to a division. The 109th (along with the 91st Infantry Division) were considered square divisions because they had two infantry brigades (5000 men each) with two infantry regiments each. During the buildup prior to the attack of Iwo-jima General Kuribayashi divided the 109th and each was built up to maximum strengths. The 109th, as the Ogasawara island Detachment was the Ogasawara (Bonin Islands) District Group, also called the Ogasawara Army Group, with an approximate strength of 47,000 troops.

1st Brigade
The 1st Independent Mixed Brigade, led by Major General Tachibana, and the 17th Independent Mixed Regiment, as well as other elements, were stationed on Chichi Jima (Father Island) with approximately 25,000 troops. Many were deployed to other island defenses such as the rest of the middle cluster known as Father Island (groups); Ani-jima, Ototo-jima, Mago-jima, along with islets Higashi-jima, Nishi-jima, and Minami-jima. The northernmost cluster or Groom Islands (group) included; Yome-jima, Muko-jima, and Nakōdo-jima or Nakadachi-jima. The southernmost cluster known as the Mother Island (group) of Haha-jima, Ane-jima, Imōto-jima, Mei-jima, along with the smaller Hira-shima and Muko-jima. These groups of islands were by-passed when Iwo-jima was chosen to attack but were subjected to bombing and naval shelling by the U.S. military.

2nd Brigade
The 2nd Independent Mixed Brigade, led by Major General Kotau Osuga, and the Third Battalion of the 17th Regiment, led by Major Tomachi Fujiwara, was on Iwo Jima with Kuribayashi. The 2700 man 145th infantry regiment under Colonel Masuo Ikeda, a part of 46th division, was diverted from Saipan to Iwo Jima and Rear Admiral Toshinosuke Ichimaru that arrived with 2300 navy personnel.

Many of the 109th's personnel had previously served in China, Burma and the Dutch East Indies and had become reservists who were now reluctant to go back to battle. To bolster morale the Japanese Emperor Hirohito sent his own palace guard of anti-aircraft gunners to Chichi Jima to support the troops—as it was expected the main force of Americans would strike there, however the Allied Joint Chiefs of Staff decided to bypass Chichi Jima altogether.

Preparations

With preparations underway Kuribayashi worked with the tactic of defense-in-depth building numerous pillboxes for machine-gunners and 13,000 yards of tunnels with even a field-hospital worked in. However he had issues with many officers—dismissing 18 of them along with his Chief-of-staff, Kuribayashi also lost control of the Naval troops who dug in on the beaches.

The Battle Begins

On 19 February 1945 the battle began, but quickly came the feeling that the 109th were doomed as air or naval relief would not be able to help. Kuribayashi ordered his troops to inflict maximum damage and casualties on the enemy and to "kill 10 men before dying".

For 33 days the 109th fought on Iwo Jima, facing against tanks and heavy bombardments from the sea and air. In the end only 1083 Japanese survived, with a mere 216 captured from the 109th's 21,000 men during the battle, the other 867 Japanese soldiers came from other units. As for Kuribayashi, it is generally thought that he committed suicide by leading the last major counterattack. The rest held out hungry and alone in Iwo Jima's tunnels until the U.S. soldiers used explosives to clear the tunnels weeks later.

Elements of the 109th
The 109th Division comprised the 1st and 2nd Mixed Brigade. The 3rd Battalion of the 17th Independent Mixed Regiment was on Iwo Jima and there were many attached units

Headquarters Group
The 109th Chief of staff (detached to Chichi jima);  Colonel Hori, was replaced with Colonel Tadashi Takaishi

Communications
Anti-Aircraft, Major Shotaro Azuma
Headquarters Guard
Storm Company
Rocket Gun, Group B
Water Works
Ammunition Depot
Independent Trench Mortar 1st Company
Field Hospital (109th division)

145th Regiment
Commanding officer; Colonel Masuo Ikeda, approx. 2,700 men
First Battalion; Major mitsuaki Hara
Second Battalion; Major Yasutake
Third Battalion; Major Kenro Anso
Artillery Battalion; Captain Matsuda
Engineer Battalion; Captain Kikuzo Musashino
Field Hospital

145th Infantry Regiment, Captain Masuda
Second Middle Mortar Battalion; Major Jusuke Nadao
Third Middle Mortar Battalion; Major Koichiro Kobayashi

Third Battalion
Third Battalion, 17th Independent Mixed Regiment; Major Tomachi Fujiwara

26th Tank Regiment

Commanding officer; Lieutenant Colonel (Baron) Takeichi Nishi, 600 men and what started as 19 tanks. Many of the tanks were disassembled and the turrets concealed so they could be used with less threat of being destroyed by bombardment.

2nd Mixed Brigade
Commanding officer; General Osuga was replaced with Major General Sadasue Senda, approx. 5200 men
309th Independent Infantry Battalion; Captain Awatsu
310th Independent Infantry Battalion; Major Iwatani
311th Independent Infantry Battalion; Major Tatsumi
312th Independent Infantry Battalion; Captain Osada
314th Independent Infantry Battalion; Captain Hakuda
Artillery Battalion, Major Kazuo Maeda
Engineer Battalion, Major Maekawa
Field Hospital, Major Masaru Inaok

Brigade Artillery Group, Colonel Chosaku Kaido
Second Mixed Brigade artillery unit; Major Kazuo Maeda
20th Independent Artillery Mortar Battalion; Captain Mitsuo Mizutari
8th Independent Anti-Tank Battalion; Captain Hajime Shimizu
9th Independent Anti-Tank Battalion; Major Okubo
10th Independent Anti-Tank Battalion; Major Matsushita
11th Independent Anti-Tank Battalion; Captain Node
12th Independent Anti-Tank Battalion; Captain Masao Hayauchi
1st Independent Machine Gun Battalion; Captain Ko Kawanami
2nd Independent Machine Gun Battalion; Major Tokio Kawasaki

Navy

Imperial Japanese Navy (IJN); Rear Admiral Rinosuke Ichimaru, arrived with 2,216 naval personnel 
Naval Guard Force, Captain Samaji Inoue
20th Special Machine Cannon Unit; 2nd Lieutenant Momozaki, attached to IJN Guard Force 
21st Special Machine Cannon Unit; 2nd Lieutenant Isamu Kondo, attached to IJN Guard Force
43rd Special Machine Cannon Unit; 1st Lieutenant Tamara, attached to IJN Guard Force
44th Special Machine Cannon Unit; unknown, attached to IJN Guard Force
Operations, Commander Takeji Mase
Communications, Lieutenant Commander Shigeru Arioka
Engineering, Lieutenant Commander Narimasa Okada
Supply, Lieutenant Commander Okazaki
Suribachi Commander, Captain Kanehiko Atsuchi
125th Anti-Aircraft Defense Unit, Lieutenant (j.g.) Tamura
132nd Anti-Aircraft Defense Unit, Ensign Okumura
141st Anti-Aircraft Defense Unit, Lieutenant (j.g.) Doi
204th Naval Construction Battalion, Lieutenant Fujiro Iida,  1,233 men

Other units
Rocket Gun Company; Captain Yoshio Yokoyama
Fifth Fortress Engineer Company; unknown
21st Well Drilling Team; unknown
Iwo Freight Depot Team; unknown
Engineer unit, mixed 1st brigade; unknown

The exact strength of Navy personnel is subject to question. With an estimate of approximately 21,000 troops it was reported that the IJA had 17,500 troops and the IJN had 5,500 troops and another report 13,586 IJA and 7,347 IJN troops.

Knowledgeable Predictions
During a dinner with Major Yoshitaka Horie (in charge of 109th Divisions Detached Headquarters on Chichi Jima) Kuribayashi asked Horie his opinion for defending Iwo Jima, to which Horie replied it was vulnerable as "a pile of eggs" and better to sink it to the bottom of the ocean with enough explosives. Kuribayashi—who had spent much time in Canada as deputy military attache and traveled often in America—was in agreement, however they knew that at 628 miles from Tokyo Iwo Jima would be "a dagger aimed straight at the heart of the homeland". Before leaving Japan to take up his post, Kuribayashi had informed his wife not to expect him home.

See also
 List of Japanese Infantry Divisions
Independent Mixed Brigades (Imperial Japanese Army)

References

Japanese World War II divisions
Infantry divisions of Japan
Military units and formations established in 1937
Military units and formations disestablished in 1939
Military units and formations established in 1944
Military units and formations disestablished in 1945
1937 establishments in Japan
1939 disestablishments in Japan
1944 establishments in Japan
1945 disestablishments in Japan